Oshu or Ōshū may refer to:
Another name for Mutsu Province, a former Japanese province
Ōshū, Iwate, Japan, a city
Northern Fujiwara (Ōshū Fujiwara-shi), a Japanese noble family
Ōshū Corporation